Gianfranco Baraldi (born  29 September 1935) is a former Italian middle distance runner.

Biography
Gianfranco Baraldi participated at two editions of the Summer Olympics (1956, 1960), he has 17 caps in national team from 1955 to 1960.

He is president for ten years, from 2012 to 2017, of the National Associazione Nazionale Atleti Azzurri d’Italia (Association of Blue Athletes of Italy), ANAAI. In the following four years, Stefano Mei succeeded him, in 2021 he was elected president of the Italian Athletics Federation (FIDAL).

Achievements

National titles
Gianfranco Baraldi has won 9 times the individual national championship.
3 wins in 800 metres (1956, 1958, 1959)
4 wins in 1500 metres (1955, 1956, 1957, 1958)
1 win in 5000 metres (1957)
1 win in Cross country running (1958)

See also
 Italy at the 1956 Summer Olympics
 Italy at the 1960 Summer Olympics

References

External links
 

1935 births
Italian male cross country runners
Italian male middle-distance runners
Athletes (track and field) at the 1956 Summer Olympics
Athletes (track and field) at the 1960 Summer Olympics
Olympic athletes of Italy
Living people